The Cardinal O'Donnell Cup is an annual senior league competition organised by Louth GAA for the Division 1 teams in Gaelic football in County Louth.

Format
All 12 teams play each other once, with the top four traditionally qualifying for the semi-final stage. The semi-final victors then face off in the final of the competition. There is also relegation to Division 2 for the worst-performing team(s).

Trophy
The winning team is presented with the Cardinal O'Donnell Cup, named after Patrick O'Donnell, who was Catholic Archbishop of Armagh and Primate of All Ireland from 1924 until his death in October 1927.

The trophy, which was donated to the County Board of Louth GAA by the Cardinal in 1926,is a replica of the Ardagh Chalice. The inaugural winners of the competition were Wolfe Tones of Drogheda.

Winners
 winners also won Louth Senior Football Championship that year

§ Title awarded to St Mary's after objection. Plunketts fielded an ineligible player

See also

References

External links
 Louth GAA official website
 Louth on Hoganstand

Gaelic football in County Louth
Competitions|